Sotenäs is a wave farm located in Kungshamn, in the municipality of Sotenäs, Sweden. The facility consists of 36 wave energy converters (WECs), with a total installed capacity of nearly 3 MW. Each WEC generates power using point absorber buoys connected to linear generators on the seabed. According to Seabased, the technology used in the project could deliver electricity for under 10 cents per kWh. Initial announcements stated that the power plant would eventually expand to around 10 MW capacity, but in 2017 Seabased announced it would no longer expand the plant beyond the 36 WECs already in place.

History 
 In February 2010, the Swedish Energy Agency awarded an investment grant to Fortum and Seabased for the wave power station.
9 December 2011, Fortum and Seabased sign an agreement to jointly construct a wave power station in Sotenäs, Sweden. Seabased agreed to manufacture buoys, generators, substations and converters at a factory to be built in Lysekil. Fortum announced the power station would produce 10 MW by 2015, using 420 buoys.
 14 January 2016, the four buoys were connected to the WEC, and thus generating electric power for the first time. An additional 32 WECs were eventually installed.
In October 2017, Seabased announced it would no longer expand the Sotenäs power plant as originally planned. At the time of the announcement, the site was not actively generating power, but Seabased planned to continue to use it for research and testing purposes.
In late 2017, Fortum transferred ownership of the power station to Seabased. Seabased announced it would use the site for testing and technology demonstration.

See also 
 List of wave power stations

References 

Wave farms in Sweden